Warp Films is an independent film and television production company based in Sheffield & London, UK.

History 2001 – 2012
Warp Films was established by Warp Records founding partners Rob Mitchell and Steve Beckett. It was initially created with financial support from NESTA and had a remit to produce a number of short films.

After the death of Rob Mitchell in 2001, Beckett decided to continue with Warp Films and enlisted the expertise of Sheffield friend Mark Herbert (who had just produced the critically acclaimed first series of Peter Kay's Phoenix Nights for Channel 4) to run the company.

The first film, Chris Morris' My Wrongs#8245-8249 & 117, was shot in 2002. It won the award for Best Short Film at the 2003 BAFTA Film Awards and became the first short film DVD single in the UK market.

Through the star of My Wrongs, Paddy Considine, Herbert met director Shane Meadows and asked them to generate an idea for a film. Herbert raised the funding and the result was Warp Films debut feature, Dead Man's Shoes, directed by Shane Meadows in 2004.

Shot in 22 days on a tight budget, and produced from Warp Films' Sheffield office (at that time a shed in Herbert's garden), it earned a BAFTA nomination, was nominated for a record eight British Independent Film Awards, won the Hitchcock D'or at the Dinard Festival, and won the Southbank award for Best Film. It received strong critical acclaim and has been hailed as a landmark in British cinema.
It was ranked No. 27 in Empire magazines list of the best British films ever

In 2005, Warp Films produced Rubber Johnny, an experimental short and 42-page book by director Chris Cunningham, featuring music by Warp Records artist Aphex Twin.

Warp Films break-out success came with Shane Meadows' This Is England, the story of Shaun, a boy who is adopted by a local skinhead gang after his father is killed in the Falklands war. Since its release in early 2007 it has gained many awards including the Best Film at the British Independent Films Awards, the Special Jury Prize at the Rome Film Festival and Best British Film at the BAFTAs.

At the same ceremony, Warp Films received its third BAFTA as Paddy Considine's directorial debut Dog Altogether won the Best Short Film award.

Three months after This Is England was released in cinemas, Warp's third feature film, Grow Your Own, was released by Pathe. The film was Warp's first collaboration with BBC Films. The film was directed by Richard Laxton and written by Frank Cottrell Boyce and Carl Hunter, developed from stories Carl had uncovered in his documentary work about the travails of immigrants. Produced by Barry Ryan for Warp Films, Luke Alkin for BBC Films and Carl Hunter for Art in Action.

In 2004, Warp Films made a significant expansion in its capacity. Robin Gutch joined Mark Herbert and Barry Ryan to devise the Warp bid for the Low Budget Film Scheme tender put out by Film4 and UK Film Council. The Warp bid was backed by Optimum Releasing, Screen Yorkshire and EM Media. Warp won the tender against stiff competition and Warp X was formally set up as Warp X in 2005 as a low-budget digital 'studio' to develop and produce films with focus on new talent and commercial potential.

The first projects under the new label were Chris Waitt's A Complete History of My Sexual Failures and Olly Blackburn's Donkey Punch, which were both launched at the Sundance International Film Festival in 2007. These were followed by Mark Tonderai's Hush Paul King's Bunny & the Bull
(Toronto International Film Festival 2009, BIFA award for Best Production Achievement 2010,
) Xiaolu Guo's She, a Chinese
( in collaboration with Tiger Lily Films) which won the Golden Leopard at the Locarno International Film Festival
) .

Another Warp X production was 2009 documentary All Tomorrow's Parties, covering the history of the All Tomorrow's Parties music festival. The film was created using footage generated by the fans and musicians attending the events themselves, on a multitude of formats including Super8, camcorder and mobile phone.

In 2009, Warp films produced Exhibit A, a groundbreaking pseudo-documentary film.  The film was awarded the title of 'Best UK feature' at the Raindance Film Festival and was nominated for three British Independent Film Awards receiving particular credit for its standout cast.

In 2010, Warp Films produced Chris Morris’s debut feature Four Lions, a satirical comedy drama following a group of homegrown Islamic terrorists from Sheffield, England. The film was a critical and box office success, achieving impressive numbers at the box office on its opening weekend, generating the highest site average of all the new releases (£5,292) and making a total of £609,000. As of 8 August 2010, Four Lions grossed £2,932,366 at the UK box office. The film was nominated for two BAFTA awards; it won the 'Outstanding Debut by a British Writer, director, or Producer' BAFTA award for Chris Morris.

Richard Ayoade's debut feature Submarine starring Noah Taylor, Sally Hawkins and Paddy Considine premiered at the Toronto International Film Festival in 2010
and was released in the UK during March 2011 by Optimum Releasing. It was distributed in the US by The Weinstein Company.

The film was met with high critical acclaim, and featured original songs by Arctic Monkeys front man Alex Turner. Submarine has won many awards worldwide, including the Best Screenplay award at the 2011 British Independent Film Awards. Richard Ayoade was nominated for a BAFTA for Outstanding Debut by a British Writer, Director or Producer at the 65th British Academy Film Awards

Warp Films 2010 television production for Channel 4, Shane Meadows' This Is England '86, was a continuation from the 2006 film. It aired over four weekly episodes and received numerous plaudits, including a BAFTA award for leading actress Vicky McClure.
It achieved record viewing figures for Channel 4.

Warp X production Kill List was released in the UK on 28 August 2011. Directed by Ben Wheatley, the film stars Neil Maskell, Michael Smiley and MyAnna Buring. It has gone on to win several awards internationally, including a British Independent Film Award for supporting actor Michael Smiley.
Kill List has received strong critical acclaim, with Total Film declaring it 'Outstanding' and giving a 5 star rating. It was released in the US by IFC films.

Tyrannosaur, also produced through Warp X, was released in 2011. Directed by Paddy Considine, it was an exploration of how love and friendship can be found in the darkest of places. Tyrannosaur stars Peter Mullan, Olivia Colman and Eddie Marsan. It has received strong critical acclaim and won the BAFTA for 'Outstanding Debut by a British Writer, director, or Producer' for director Paddy Considine and producer Diarmid Scrimshaw.

2011 also saw the world premiere of Justin Kurzel's Snowtown in Semaine du Critiique at the Cannes International Film Festival. In 2008, Warp Films had established Warp Films Australia in Melbourne, headed up by Anna McLeish.
The film has received widespread acclaim and won numerous awards internationally, including four awards at the Australian Academy Cinema Television Awards. In late 2015, the partnership ended with the setting up of Carver Films by Anna McLeish and Sarah Shaw.

This Is England '88, the sequel to the 2010 television series This Is England '86, aired on Channel 4 over three consecutive nights from 13 December 2011.
Set two and half years after '86, it received strong critical praise. The series had high viewing figures, with 2.5 million people tuning-in to watch the first episode.

Warp Films / Warp X productions, Tyrannosaur, Kill List and Submarine were nominated for a total of 18 awards at the 2011 British Independent Film Awards.

Warp Films successfully ran a crowd-funding campaign to fund four short films shot at the All Tomorrow's Parties music festival by Vincent Moon, using the website Kickstarter.com. The project reached its funding goal on 15 October and the films are currently in post-production.

Warp Films produced three 30-minute television dramas for the Sky Arts Playhouse Presents season. These were The Minor Character, written by Will Self and starring David Tennant (which was Sky Arts highest rating commission on the channel
), The Snipist directed by Matthew Holness and The District Nurse starring Gina McKee.

TV drama

Filmography

Warp X Productions

TV Shorts/Comedy

Short films

References

External links
 Warp Films

Film production companies of the United Kingdom
Television production companies of the United Kingdom
Mass media in Sheffield
Mass media companies established in 1999
1999 establishments in England